Q is reserved by the ICAO for international radiocommunications and other non-geographical special uses.

Q